The fragile miner bee  (Andrena fragilis) is a species of miner bee in the family Andrenidae. It is found in North America.

References

Further reading

External links

 

fragilis
Articles created by Qbugbot
Insects described in 1853